The Afrin Dam, officially 17 April Dam, also called Maydanki Dam, is an earth-filled water storage and hydroelectric power dam on the Afrin River in northwest Syria. It is currently under the control of the Turkish Land Forces.

After the 2023 Turkey–Syria earthquake, the Afrin Dam suffered damage, with visible cracks on its surface, raising concerns that the dam could collapse. Activists and journalists were prevented from visiting the dam by the Syrian National Army. Water levels were reportedly low at the time.

Location

The dam is north of the town of Afrin in northwest Syria.
A large part of the region is planted with olive and fruit trees. 
About 80% of the area depends on rainwater irrigation, and the remainder on wells and pumps.
Before the dam was built the orchards and other crops were irrigated, but the olive trees were not.
The Afrin District is populated by Kurds, the furthest west of the Syrian Kurdish regions.

The Afrin River originates in the south of the Kartal Mountains in Turkey, crosses into Syria where it runs through the city of Afrin, and then crosses back into Turkey. About  of the annual flow of the river comes from the Hatay Province of Turkey, while about  originates in Syria.

History

The dam was intended to irrigate land in the river valley in the region between Aleppo and the border with Turkey.
The project was approved in 1984 after extensive studies by the Ministry of Irrigation.

Construction began in 1997. The dam was built for the General Water Resources Authority at a total cost of LS 58.2 billion, including the cost of land acquisition for the reservoir.  of earth and rock was excavated during construction. The dam was inaugurated on 24 April 2004 in the presence of Prime Minister Muhammad Naji al-Otari. Syrian state resolution No. 1849 of 2004 declared that the 17 April Dam Lake was a protected area.

A 2016 report noted that water usage appeared to have dropped due to the Syrian Civil War. On 9 March 2018, during Operation Olive Branch, armed units belonging to the Syrian National Army rebel faction and the Turkish Armed Forces seized control of the dam, capturing it from the Kurdish-majority People's Protection Units (YPG).

On 13 January 2019, body filling, water intake structure, reinforced concrete and mechanical cover systems were completed and repaired by the Turkish State Hydraulic Works (DSI), who renamed it the  Upper Afrin Dam.

Dam

There are also wells and tunnels for inspection and drainage of water infiltrating the dam. An innovative network of electrical measurement devices is installed in the body of the dam and the different facilities, including those for measuring temperature and seismic activity. The hydroelectric plant provides 25 MW of power.

Reservoir
Irrigation plans are 52% olive trees, 11% fruit trees, 31% crops such as wheat, barley, beets, watermelons and cotton, and 6% other vegetables. Drinking water is supplied to about 197,000 people.

Tourism 
Maydanki Lake is a popular domestic recreational spot, often visited by Aleppians in the summer for picnics and swimming. Local tourism diminished as result of the civil war, however, and mostly collapsed during Operation Olive Branch. Nevertheless, the region's tourism sector had begun to recover by July 2018, with two of the lake's ten cafes and restaurants reopened.

Notes

Sources

Dams in Syria
Orontes basin
Buildings damaged by the 2023 Turkey–Syria earthquake